Armada Arndale is a shopping centre  located in the suburb of Kilkenny in South Australia and is managed by Armada Funds Management. It used to be managed by Vicinity Centres (formerly Federation Centres) and Westfield. The facility is located at the intersection of main arterial roads, Torrens, Hanson and Regency roads. There are approximately 120 retailers including Harris Scarfe, Big W, Woolworths, Foodland, Aldi, and Greater Union cinemas with over 2,500 parking places.

History
Armada Arndale was first opened in 1963. It was built for the UK Development company Arndale Property Trust. It was the first in Australia of a chain of shopping centres by the Arndale development group, the other being Westfield Marion. It was the first fully enclosed shopping centre in Australia to have air conditioning.

The centre had a number of extensions in 1970, 1984, 1999, 2004 and most recently a significant refurbishment completed in August 2013.

Redevelopment

A redevelopment of Arndale was approved by the Charles Sturt Council on 11 October 2006, for the addition of 5,800 m² of lettable area and providing up to 50 new stores.

This has resulted in a $100 million development, adding a total of 11,350 m² of floor space or roughly 28 percent more space than previous levels.  The redevelopment includes a newer Big W store, refurbished Woolworths supermarket, two small new malls, three new entrances, and additional parking spaces. 

Changes to the Charles Sturt development plan require for the rezoning of part of the site to include the use of supermarkets, discount shops and restaurants have been approved. 

Former owner Vicinity Centres also had plans for at least another two stages of development, expected to cost between $100 and 150 million.

In May 2016, Armada Funds Management announced the other two stages will go ahead with the creation of over 70 stores, and over 1500 jobs.

Sale

Vicinity Centre’s confirmed on 13 May 2014, that they planned to sell Arndale Central for $140 million, as part of their company restructure.

A Vicinity Centre's ASX announcement on 25 September 2014, confirmed they were in talks with Armada Funds Management in relation to the sale of the centre. The centre would be sold for around $152 million with the transaction expected to settle in late October 2014.

References

Shopping centres in Adelaide
Shopping malls established in 1963
1963 establishments in Australia